The Embassy of Turkey in Tokyo is the diplomatic mission of Turkey in Japan. It was established in 1925. The Embassy  Building were designed by the famous Japanese Architect Kenzō Tange.  Korkut GÜNGEN has been the current Ambassador since 15 March 2021.

References 

Turkey
Tokyo
Japan–Turkey relations
Buildings and structures in Shibuya